Gast Groeber (born 1960) is a writer from Luxembourg. He grew up in Hollerich and studied at the Institut Supérieur d'Études et de Recherches Pédagogiques in Walferdange. He has been pursuing various careers in education since then. He is also a prize-winning author. His book of short stories All Dag Verstoppt En Aneren won the European Union Prize for Literature.

References

Luxembourgian writers
1960 births
Living people